Isgandar Chandirli Huseyn oglu is an Azerbaijani politician, Ex-director of State Procurement Agency of Azerbaijan Republic.

He was appointed the Director of the State Procurement Agency in the November 19, 2008 reshuffle of the Cabinet of Ministers of Azerbaijan. He's been a proponent of switching to full electronic bidding in purchase and sale transactions of the government.

See also
Cabinet of Azerbaijan

References 

Living people
Government ministers of Azerbaijan
Year of birth missing (living people)